Banovići is a town and municipality located in Tuzla Canton of the Federation of Bosnia and Herzegovina, an entity of Bosnia and Herzegovina. It is located in northeastern Bosnia and Herzegovina. The intensive development of Banovići began with the construction of the railway Brčko-Banovići in the year 1946. Due to its quality, brown coal from Banovići is well-known all over Europe.

Geography
Banovići Municipality is situated on the foothills of Konjuh mountain. Town settlement of Banovići was built on the embankments of Litva river. Its average height above sea-level is 332 meters. The municipality encompasses 185 km2 and it includes the following settlements:
Borovac, Banovići Selo, Ćatići, Milići, Mrgan, Repnik, Podgorje, Grivice, Treštenica Donja, Treštenica Gornja, Tulovići, Oskova, Željova, Omazići, Lozna, Seona, Pribitkovići, Stražbenica and Gornji Bučik. According to the 1991 census, there were 26,507 inhabitants, out of the number there were 72% Bosniaks, 17% of Serbs, 2% of Croats and 9% of the others. According to some estimates in 2000, the population of Banovići is about 29,000, and a considerable number of them are refugees.

History
The oldest settlement known is located on Gradina hill at Tulovići village, dated from Pre-historical period, according to the material culture remaining. There is a system of caves in Pribitkovići village, rich in cave adornments. The origin of the central settlement's name is revealed by a stećak in Banović selo, which, beside ornaments and the lily flower carved into the stone, also has an inscription written in Bosnian Cyrillic script. There were several necropola of stećaks found, beside Banovići, that used to belong to Dramešin county: Stražba, Draganja and Treštenica. The county and settlements are mentioned by this name also in Turkish sources. This name of the county was sustained until the 19th century.
The intensive development of Banovići began with construction of the Brčko-Banovići railway in 1946.  There were only a few houses at Banovići settlement, but by 1961 there were already 4,611 inhabitants. The settlement acquired all features of a modern urban town environment. This is due to exploitation of quality brown coal and construction of a large number of industrial facilities of metal and non-metal industry, as well as construction of a modern road between Živinice and Zavidovići. Due to its quality, brown coal from Banovići is well-known all over Europe. The exploitation of brown coal is the basis of further development of Banovići, as well as of Tuzla Canton.

Tourism

The Municipality of Banovići has good preconditions for the development of tourism based on hunting on the slopes of Konjuh, as well as for the development of tourism based on fishing in several mountain rivers: the Oskova, the Krabanja, the Zlaća and the Studešnica. „Zlaća“ mountain motel is one of the best mountain recreation facilities in Tuzla Canton. „Zobik“ mountain house is well known to all those in Bosnia and Herzegovina who like nature. In the village of Pribitkovići there is Borovac, an interesting series of caves rich with cave ornaments. Mountain Konjuh is habitat of following animals: brown bear, deer, wolf, fox, boar, capercaillie, squirrel.

Economy
"RMU Banovići" is a Bosnia and Herzegovina-based company principally engaged in the mining industry. The company’s main activities are: underground exploitation, surface exploitation, separation and distribution of brown coal. The company operates the Banovići mines and the coal separation facility in Oskova. "RMU Banovići" has about 2.600 employees. It is one of the most successful coal mining companies in Bosnia and ex-Yugoslavia. RMU sells 60% of its output to the Tuzla Power Plant (coal-fired) located nearby and also supplies coal to Bosnian households and exports to Croatia and Serbia. "RMU Banovići" has invested 40 million KM in modernising its equipment over the last few years, helping it generate combined profits of 20 million KM (convertible marks).

Other important companies are: Stove factory "Helios", Building materials factory "FGO", Clothing factory "Borac", etc.

Culture
Building of "Radnički Dom" (Workers Dome/Centre) is a centre for cultural happenings. The building includes a radio station, city library, theatre and central restaurant. Radnički Dom is also "home" of a mural with motifs from Husinska buna (miners' rebellion in Husino) painted, in the early 1960s by one of the greatest Bosnian and ex-Yugoslavian painters, Ismet Mujezinović.

The city cinema hall was renewed few years ago and has a new name (BKC = Bosanski kulturni centar/Bosnian culture centre).

A youth centre "Pinkland" was created in 1995th to fill some of the  social, cultural, and recreational gaps (those gaps resulted from the War in Bosnia). The centre offers classes in computers, music, painting, woodworking, and dance, as well as sports, summer camps, and picnics to more than 1,600 members. Pinkland cooperates also with the local schools, social authorities, police and other non-governmental organizations. The most important international partners are the Government of Canada, Swiss Agency for Development and Cooperation (SDC), Finnish University Humak and Finnish NGO Etnokult.

Sport
FK Budućnost Banovići is the oldest sport club in the municipality of Banovići. In Bosnian Budućnost means "Future", which symbolizes the hope people had for the times to come when the club was founded in 1947. The club plays at the Gradski Stadion (eng. City Stadium), which has a capacity of 5,000. Their primary colours are dark green and black. This club has entered Republic league of Bosnia and Herzegovina in season 1978–79, which was their biggest success at that time.

Today, FK Budućnost Banovići is a member of the Football Association of Bosnia and Herzegovina. FK Budućnost were promoted to the Premier League of Bosnia and Herzegovina in season 1998–99. Later, in season 2000–01, Budućnost played against FK Drnovice from the Czech Republic. Budućnost now plays in the First League of Federation of Bosnia and Herzegovina.

Music
There were several bands in Banovići in the last few years. Some of them are still active, for example: Impuls, Aquarius and Domavia. Impuls had tens of gigs in town and in other places. Aquarius has recorded one music video. Domavia participated on BH Radio Festival. Enver Lugavić - Kice (guitarist and singer of ex - Loše Vrijeme) took 2nd place on OBN Music Talents Show in 2003. Finnish NGO Etnokult and Finnish University Humak are organizers of the Bosna Faces world music festival in cooperation with Pinkland in Banovici Chomy chome.

Scouting and mountaineering

Scouting community "Plamen" was formed on 1 September 1956. Since then community works on process of non-formal life education, informing and fun for young people through promotions of scouting activities, organization of scout competitions, picnics, summer camps and education about ecology. Community counts 150 active members.

Mountaineering club "Varda" exists for long time too. Their member, Miralem Husanović - Muri, has participated in several expeditions: Manaslu (Himalaya), Denali (Mount McKinley), Mont Blanc, Gran Paradiso, Matterhorn, etc.

Demographics

Twin towns – sister cities

Banovići is twinned with:
 Bečej, Serbia
 Labin, Croatia

Gallery

References

 Official results from the book: Ethnic composition of Bosnia-Herzegovina population, by municipalities and settlements, 1991. census, Zavod za statistiku Bosne i Hercegovine - Bilten no.234, Sarajevo 1991.
 Script about Tuzla Canton, 2001

External links
 Official site

Cities and towns in the Federation of Bosnia and Herzegovina
Populated places in Banovići
Municipalities of the Tuzla Canton